The men's individual road race at the 2000 Summer Olympics in Sydney, Australia, was held on Wednesday, 27 September 2000 (the second day of competition of the games) with a race distance of 239.4 km. The estimated global TV audience was 600 million. They were specifically held in Sydney's Eastern Suburbs. There were 154 cyclists from 41 nations competing. The maximum number of cyclists per nation had been five since professionals were allowed in 1996. The event was won by Jan Ullrich of Germany, the nation's first victory in the men's individual road race (though Olaf Ludwig of East Germany had won in 1988). His teammate Andreas Klöden's bronze made this race the first time one nation had taken two medals in the event since 1988—when West Germany had done so by taking silver and bronze (making an all-German podium then, with Ludwig's gold). Alexander Vinokourov took silver for Kazakhstan's first medal in the event.

Background

This was the 16th appearance of the event, previously held in 1896 and then at every Summer Olympics since 1936. It replaced the individual time trial event that had been held from 1912 to 1932; the time trial had been re-introduced in 1996 alongside the road race. The change to including professionals in 1996 meant that 2000 was the first Games that saw significant repeat competitors in the event (which had typically seen top cyclists turn professional after one appearance); Atlanta silver medalist Rolf Sørensen of Denmark and bronze medalist Max Sciandri of Great Britain returned. Favorites were "difficult" to select for the one-day race. Lance Armstrong (1999 and 2000 Tour de France winner) and Jan Ullrich (1997 Tour de France winner) were among the prominent cyclists, but the road race was a very different event from a Tour and "neither was considered a great sprinter".

Egypt and Kyrgyzstan each made their debut in the men's individual road race. Great Britain made its 16th appearance in the event, the only nation to have competed in each appearance to date.

Competition format and course

The mass-start race was on a 239.4 kilometre course over the Cycling Road Course in Sydney's Centennial Parklands. The distance had been increased from previous Olympic road races (particularly pre-1996, though the distance was nearly 20 kilometres more than 1996 as well) to be more consistent with professional races.

Schedule

All times are Australian Eastern Standard Time (UTC+10)

Results

A three-cyclist breakout occurred with 25 kilometres to go: Ullrich and two of his Deutsche Telekom teammates, Vinokourov and Klöden.

References

Sources
 Official Report of the 2000 Sydney Summer Olympics available at https://web.archive.org/web/20060622162855/http://www.la84foundation.org/5va/reports_frmst.htm

Men's Road Race
Cycling at the Summer Olympics – Men's road race
Men's events at the 2000 Summer Olympics